Maria Irene Sundbom (born 19 May 1975, in Uppsala) is a Swedish actress. She belongs to the ensemble of Uppsala City Theatre.

Filmography
2005 - Lasermannen (TV series)
2006 - LasseMajas detektivbyrå (TV series)
2007 - Solstorm
2009 - Barbieblues
2009 - Maskeraden
2011 - Bron (TV)
2019 - Quicksand (Netflix Series)

References

External links

1975 births
Living people
Swedish actresses
People from Uppsala